Hospital Run is a stream in the U.S. state of West Virginia.

Hospital Run was so named for the fact an Indian who recovered from his wounds near its banks.

See also
List of rivers of West Virginia

References

Rivers of Pocahontas County, West Virginia
Rivers of West Virginia